Major-General John Simson Stuart Martin CSI (18 June 1888 – 24 December 1973) was a Scottish doctor in the Indian Medical Service.  He served during both World Wars.

Born in Stornoway, he was educated at Oban High School, Rockhampton Grammar School (Queensland) and the University of Edinburgh.  He was commissioned into the Indian Medical Service in 1912. He served in Mesopotamia from November 1914 until April 1916 he was taken prisoner by the Turks at the fall of Kut. He was mentioned in despatches in 1916. By the time of the start of the Second World War, he was a Colonel, and was further promoted to substantive Major-General 6 March 1943, retiring 6 March 1945.

He latterly lived at Glendale, in the Isle of Skye.  He died at Gesto Hospital on the island.

His daughter Lorna is the wife of immunologist Avrion Mitchison.

References

1888 births
1973 deaths
Companions of the Order of the Star of India
Alumni of the University of Edinburgh
Scottish military medical officers
Indian Medical Service officers
Indian Army generals of World War II
Indian Army personnel of World War I
19th-century Scottish medical doctors
20th-century Scottish medical doctors
Scottish military personnel
British people in colonial India